Nephelobotys is a genus of moths of the family Crambidae. It contains only one species, Nephelobotys nephelistalis, which is found in China (Hubei).

References

Natural History Museum Lepidoptera genus database

Pyraustinae
Crambidae genera
Monotypic moth genera
Taxa named by Eugene G. Munroe